Daniel-Henri Druey (12 April 1799 – 29 March 1855) was a Swiss politician of the 19th century and a founding father of constitutional democracy and member of Free Democratic Party in Switzerland.

Early life
Druey was born in Faoug in the Canton of Vaud.  After studying law at the academy in Lausanne he engaged in further study at Heidelberg, Paris and London.

Political career in Switzerland
When Druey returned to Switzerland, aged 29, he was chosen to sit on the Canton of Vaud's Great Council.  Two years later he became a member of the State Council.

Druey was elected to the Swiss Federal Council on 16 November 1848 as one of the seven initial members. During his time in office he held the following departments:
Department of Justice and Police (1848–1849)
Political Department (1850) as President of the Confederation
Department of Finance (1851)
Department of Justice and Police (1852)
Department of Finance (1853–1855)
and was President of the Confederation in 1850.

Druey died in office on 29 March 1855.

References

External links

|-
 

1799 births
1855 deaths
People from Broye-Vully District
Swiss Calvinist and Reformed Christians
Free Democratic Party of Switzerland politicians
Foreign ministers of Switzerland
Finance ministers of Switzerland
Members of the Federal Council (Switzerland)
University of Lausanne alumni